James Risser may refer to:
 James C. Risser (born 1946), American philosopher and professor of philosophy at Seattle University 
 James V. Risser (born 1938), American journalist and emeritus professor of communication at Stanford University